The Environment and Resources Authority (ERA) is the regulatory agency responsible for the natural environment in Malta. It was formed from the demerger of the Malta Environment and Planning Authority in 2016, which also resulted in the creation of the Planning Authority.

References

External links 
 

Environment of Malta
Government agencies of Malta
Environmental protection agencies
Environmental policies organizations
2016 establishments in Malta